The Sri Lankan team on their way back home from Australia visited Dhaka in March 1985. It was a very short tour; there was just one three-day fixture, played under searing March heat. Nevertheless, for the local side specially, this match produced some important achievements.

Scores in brief

Batting first, Bangladesh scored 139 in the first innings. The newly appointed skipper Gazi Ashraf Lipu and Munir both scored 39. (Tariquzzaman Munir was at that time at the top of his form. Just days earlier he had scored the highest individual score in domestic cricket, 308 for Dhaka University in the semi final of the National Cricket Championship against Dhaka District. There he had shared a partnership of 447 with Athar Ali Khan).

For Bangladesh the tail collapsed against the left-arm spin of the veteran Somachandra de Silva, who took 4/28.

In reply, the Lankan innings started disastrously as Amal Silva and Sidath Wettimuny both fell cheaply to medium pacer Jahangir Shah. The middle order however, repaired the damage and Sri Lanka eventually declared at 429/9. Ranjan Madugalle narrowly missed his hundred (95), Ravi Ratnayeke, better known as a fast bowler, blasted 79*. Jahangir Shah finished with 4/89.

Bangladesh batted in their 2nd innings and saved the match by scoring 152/6. Skipper Gazi Ashraf again led from the front, scoring a 45, and the veteran Raquibul Hasan proved his worth to the side with 32.

Importance

This game is significant in Bangladesh's cricket history for a number of reasons. First, the draw achieved was highly creditable.  Specially, the memory of the disaster that Bangladesh had faced against Sri Lanka during the 1977–78 season was partly erased. Second, this was the first time Gazi Ashraf captained the national side. He was to remain captain until 1990. During this period Bangladesh cricket went through its most important changes.

Finally, three youngsters, Minhajul Abedin, Athar Ali Khan and Gholam Nousher Prince, played for Bangladesh in this match. Although all of them failed to impress  they all went on to play vital roles in later years.

References

1985 in Bangladeshi cricket
Bangladeshi cricket seasons from 1971–72 to 2000
1984-85
International cricket competitions from 1980–81 to 1985
1985 in Sri Lankan cricket